A bochka roof or simply bochka (barrel) is a type of roof in traditional Russian church architecture that has the form of a half-cylinder with an elevated and pointed upper part, resembling a pointed kokoshnik. In English the term barrel roof is sometimes used, but this may cause confusion since Russian external barrel roofs are simply curved roofs resembling the inside of a cut-away barrel. 

Typically made of wood, the bochka roof was extensively used both in church and civilian architecture in the 17th to 18th centuries. Later it was sometimes used in Russian Revival style buildings. 

The intersection of two bochkas forms a so-called cross bochka, or cube cover.

See also
List of roof shapes
Kokoshnik (architecture)

External links
Bochka (architecture) at the Great Soviet Encyclopedia 
An illustration of the cross bochka

Roofs
Architecture in Russia
Russian inventions